The 2016 Sun Bowl (December) was a postseason college football bowl game, played on December 30, 2016. It was one of the 2016–17 bowl games concluding the 2016 FBS football season. It featured the Stanford Cardinal of the Pac-12 Conference and the North Carolina Tar Heels of the Atlantic Coast Conference.

Teams

Stanford

North Carolina

Game summary

Scoring summary

Statistics

References

2016–17 NCAA football bowl games
2016
2016 Sun Bowl
2016 Sun Bowl
December 2016 sports events in the United States
2016 in sports in Texas